is an onsen (hot spring resort) in Obama, Unzen, Nagasaki Prefecture, Japan. The hot springs system is located in the foothills of Mount Unzen Volcano.

In Japanese, the word, "obama" means "little beach" or "little island". Although at least since 2008, the town's tourism office has been greeting visitors with a life-sized statue of the former American president, Barack Obama, and vendors in town sell Barack Obama-themed towels.

Water Profile
The hot spring system known for having the hottest and most active springs in Japan, with some of them reaching 80-105 °C and producing over 15,000 tons of hot water daily. The hot spring system consists of 30 individual springs.

Environs
Its location near the seashore allows one to see the sun setting, which makes it a popular place to visit in the evenings. 
The poet Saito Mokichi wrote about Obama Onsen in his poem , and a monument with the words of the poem was erected near the onsen. The area was formerly part of Hizen Province. 

A fireworks show is held annually in December.

Cuisine
Obama Onsen is famous for its Obama Chanpon a dish made of noodles, seafood, and vegetables. The onsen has about 20 stores and restaurants nearby, serving everything from Western style food to sushi, alcoholic beverages, and interpretations of the Obama Chanpon. Shrimp are found in abundance along the beaches near the onsen, and a special soup is made from them.

Access
The onsen is accessible by bus from Isahaya Station on the Nagasaki Main Line and Ōmura Lines run by JR Kyushu, as well as the Shimabara Railway Line. The ride is about 60 minutes.

References

Hot springs of Nagasaki Prefecture
Landforms of Nagasaki Prefecture
710s establishments
Tourist attractions in Nagasaki Prefecture
8th-century establishments in Japan